The Institute of Higher Nervous Activity and Neurophysiology is a research institute located in Moscow, Russia that specializes in neuroscience, and is a part of the Russian Academy of Sciences.

Leading scientists of the institute
 E.A. Asratyan (first director)
 P.M. Balaban
 A.A. Frolov
 I.A. Shevelyov
 L.L. Voronin

References

External links
 http://www.ihna.ru/

Neuroscience research centers in Russia
N
Institutes of the Russian Academy of Sciences
Medical research institutes in the Soviet Union